The Royal Crown Open was a golf tournament on the LPGA Tour from 1959 to 1961. It was played at the Country Club of Columbus in Columbus, Georgia.

Winners
Columbus Open
1961 Mickey Wright

Royal Crown Open
1960 Wiffi Smith
1959 Betsy Rawls

References

Former LPGA Tour events
Golf in Georgia (U.S. state)
Sports in Columbus, Georgia
Recurring sporting events established in 1959
Recurring sporting events disestablished in 1961
1959 establishments in Georgia (U.S. state)
1961 disestablishments in Georgia (U.S. state)
History of women in Georgia (U.S. state)